The Real Estate and Construction functional constituency is a functional constituency in the elections for the Legislative Council of Hong Kong first created in 1991. The constituency is composed of 463 corporate members of the Real Estate Developers Association of Hong Kong, Hong Kong Construction Association, and Hong Kong E&M Contractors' Association to vote at general meetings of the Associations. Prior to the 2021 electoral overhaul, the eligible voters included individual members.

Return members

Electoral results

2020s

2010s

2000s

1990s

References

Constituencies of Hong Kong
Constituencies of Hong Kong Legislative Council
Functional constituencies (Hong Kong)
1991 establishments in Hong Kong
Constituencies established in 1991